Eli Driks (born 13 October 1964) is an Israeli former footballer who worked as marketing CEO for the basketball and football arms of Maccabi Tel Aviv.

Career statistics

International goals

Honours

 Israeli Premier League: 1991–92, 1994–95, 1995–96
 Israel State Cup: 1987, 1988, 1994, 1996
 Toto Cup: 1984–85, 1992–93, 1998–99

References

External links
Profile at One

1964 births
Israeli Jews
Living people
Israeli footballers
Israel international footballers
Maccabi Yavne F.C. players
Maccabi Tel Aviv F.C. players
Maccabi Netanya F.C. players
Maccabi Herzliya F.C. players
Liga Leumit players
Israeli Premier League players
Footballers from Petah Tikva
Association football forwards
Israeli Football Hall of Fame inductees